Ivan Mikhaylovich Semyonov (2 March 1924 – 1966) was a Soviet long-distance runner. He competed in the men's 5000 metres at the 1952 Summer Olympics.

References

1924 births
1966 deaths
Athletes (track and field) at the 1952 Summer Olympics
Soviet male long-distance runners
Olympic athletes of the Soviet Union
Place of birth missing